Marmessoidea is an Asian genus of stick insects in the family Lonchodidae and subfamily Necrosciinae.  The native range of species appears to be from India and South-East Asia to the Wallace line.

Species
The Catalogue of Life and Phasmida Species File list:

 Marmessoidea abbreviata Redtenbacher, 1908
 Marmessoidea annulata (Fabricius, 1798)
 Marmessoidea biplagiata Redtenbacher, 1908
 Marmessoidea bisbiguttata (Burmeister, 1838)
 Marmessoidea casignetus (Westwood, 1859)
 Marmessoidea chinensis Redtenbacher, 1908
 Marmessoidea conspurcata Redtenbacher, 1908
 Marmessoidea dimidiata Redtenbacher, 1908
 Marmessoidea euplectes (Westwood, 1859)
 Marmessoidea expolita Redtenbacher, 1908
 Marmessoidea flavoguttata (Stål, 1877)
 Marmessoidea flavomarginata Redtenbacher, 1908
 Marmessoidea haemorrhoidalis Redtenbacher, 1908
 Marmessoidea hainanensis Ho, 2016
 Marmessoidea incensa Redtenbacher, 1908
 Marmessoidea ismene (Westwood, 1859)
 Marmessoidea lineata Redtenbacher, 1908
 Marmessoidea liuxingyuei Ho, 2018
 Marmessoidea moesta Redtenbacher, 1908
 Marmessoidea mustea (Bates, 1865)
 Marmessoidea notata Redtenbacher, 1908
 Marmessoidea poggii Seow-Choen, 2017
 Marmessoidea quadriguttata (Burmeister, 1838)
 Marmessoidea quadrisignata Redtenbacher, 1908
 Marmessoidea rosea (Fabricius, 1793) - type species (as Necroscia marmessus Westwood probably from Malaysia)
 Marmessoidea rotundatogibbosa Redtenbacher, 1908
 Marmessoidea rubescens (Saussure, 1868)
 Marmessoidea sumatrensis Brancsik, 1893
 Marmessoidea usta Redtenbacher, 1908
 Marmessoidea vinosa (Serville, 1838)

References

External links
 

Phasmatodea genera
Phasmatodea of Asia
Lonchodidae